Rundqvist or Rundkvist is a Swedish surname that means "round twig".

Notable people with the surname include:
Adam Rundqvist (born 1990), Swedish professional ice hockey player
Danijela Rundqvist (born 1984) Swedish ice hockey player
David Rundqvist (born 1993), Swedish ice hockey player 
Martin Rundkvist (born 1972), Swedish archaeologist
Thomas Rundqvist (born 1960),  Swedish professional ice hockey player